The Bushmaster M4 or M4A3 is a semi-automatic or select-fire carbine manufactured by Bushmaster Firearms International, modeled on the AR-15. It is one of the Bushmaster XM15 line of rifles and carbines.

Design
The M4 Type Carbine is a copy of the Colt M4 carbine. The semi-automatic version is marketed to the U.S. civilian market in compliance with the National Firearms Act.  A select fire variant can be ordered by military or law enforcement organizations with three-round burst or fully automatic capability.

The rifle's caliber is .223 Remington/5.56×45mm NATO, and the barrel is hard chrome lined in both the bore and chamber. Unlike the current Colt M4 Carbine which features a four-position telescopic stock, the Bushmaster has a six-position stock. It is compatible with most standard AR-15 parts and has the ability to accept all AR-15/M16 type STANAG magazines.

Both of these comply with current U.S. federal law which states a minimum  barrel for a rifle. There is also a military M4 Type Carbine which comes with a  barrel and a removable "bird cage" flash suppressor.

An M4 Type Post-Ban Carbine was developed for the 1994 United States Federal Assault Weapons Ban requirements. Since the ban expired in 2004, this rifle has essentially been replaced by the M4A2 and M4A3. Some states in the U.S. have kept these laws, so the rifle is still being produced.

Legal issues
A trademark dispute between Bushmaster and Colt concerned the use of the "M4" name. The M4 was developed and produced for the United States government by Colt, which had an exclusive contract to produce the M4 family of weapons until 2009. Several other manufacturers, including Bushmaster, offer M4-like firearms, nicknamed "M4geries." Colt previously held a U.S. trademark on the term "M4." 

In April 2004, Colt filed a lawsuit against Bushmaster and Heckler & Koch, claiming acts of trademark infringement, trade dress infringement, trademark dilution, false designation of origin, false advertising, patent infringement, unfair competition, and deceptive trade practices. Heckler & Koch later settled out of court. On December 8, 2005, a District court judge in Maine granted a summary judgment in favor of Bushmaster Firearms, dismissing all of Colt's claims except for false advertising. On the latter claim, Colt could not recover monetary damages. The court also ruled that "M4" was now a generic name, and that Colt's trademark should be revoked.

Users

: The Bushmaster M4A3 B.M.A.S. is used by special forces units of the Czech Armed Forces. These rifles are usually seen with an M203 grenade launcher. The 601st Special Forces Group is armed with the M4A3. 
: Used by the Army and Police
: Used by NOCS.
: Used by the Kuwait 25th Commando Brigade.
: Used by Royal Malaysian Customs
: New Zealand Police (including Armed Offenders Squad and Special Tactics Group), replaced the Remington Model 7 as their standard issue rifle.
: Cambridge Police Department (Massachusetts)

Gallery

Bibliography

References

External links 
Official Bushmaster Website

5.56 mm assault rifles
7.62×39mm firearms
Police weapons
Rifles of the United States
Semi-automatic rifles
Bushmaster firearms
ArmaLite AR-10 derivatives
6.8mm firearms